My Word! is a British radio quiz panel game broadcast by the BBC on the Home Service (1956–67) and Radio 4 (1967–88). It was created by Edward J. Mason and Tony Shryane, and featured the humorous writers Frank Muir and Denis Norden, known in Britain for the series Take It From Here. The show was piloted in June 1956 on the Midland Home Service and broadcast as a series on the national Home Service network from 1 January 1957. The series also ran on BBC Television for one series from July–September 1960.

For decades the programme was also broadcast worldwide via BBC World Service and was relayed to an international audience though the BBC Transcription Services. A companion programme, My Music, ran from 1967 to 1993.

Background and first broadcasts
In 1956, Edward J. Mason and Tony Shryane, respectively the writer and producer of the popular radio soap opera The Archers, decided that by way of a change they would devise and produce what Frank Muir called "a new kind of not-very-academic literary quiz". The Aeolian Hall in London was booked for the recording of a pilot show, but at the last minute two of the four panellists were unexpectedly unavailable. Shryane sought the help of Muir and his writing partner Denis Norden, scriptwriters of the popular BBC comedy series Take It From Here, who were based in a nearby office. They thought of themselves as writers rather than performers, but at Shryane's urgent request they agreed to stand in for the absentees. Muir was partnered by Isobel Barnett – a panel show regular – and Norden by the journalist Nancy Spain. Mason set the questions, and the chairman was the cricket commentator and poet John Arlott, who was billed as "umpire". The pilot was well received by the audience in the hall and by listeners to its first transmission. The BBC commissioned a series, which was transmitted in early 1957. Muir and Norden had no intention of becoming regular panellists, but Shyrane persuaded them.

Arlott did not return for the second series, which began in August 1957. He was succeeded by Jack Longland, known to BBC listeners as the chairman of the panel show Country Questions and a regular team member on Round Britain Quiz and panellist on Any Questions? Although, unlike Arlott, Longland had no particular association with cricket he too was billed as umpire until 1962, after which he was billed as "in the chair", as were his successors.

Later series
The programme ran for 38 series, until 1988. Muir and Norden were in every series, always on opposing teams. As Muir's partner, Barnett was succeeded during the first series by the novelist and critic E. Arnot Robertson. On Robertson's death in 1961 the film critic and Greek scholar Dilys Powell took her place until the show finished, when she was aged 87. Norden's first partner was Nancy Spain; after her death in 1964 she was succeeded by the journalist Anne Scott-James, and then from 1979 by the historian Antonia Fraser. In the one season in which Fraser took the chair her place as Norden's teammate was taken by Irene Thomas.

After 20 years in the chair, Longland retired from the programme at the end of the 1977 series. He was succeeded by John Julius Norwich for four series, followed by Fraser for a single series and finally Michael O'Donnell for the last five series, from late 1983 to 1988.

From time to time guests substituted for absent regulars. Neither Spain nor Powell ever missed a broadcast during their time as panellists, but Robertson and Scott-James missed one apiece, their absences covered respectively by Pamela Frankau and Katherine Whitehorn. Lionel Hale (one of the intended contestants in the pilot show) deputised for both Muir and Norden in 1967 as did John Wells in 1975 and Barry Took on four occasions between 1978 and 1982. Ted Kavanagh took Muir's place for two programmes in 1957, and Edward Blishen stood in for Norden in two episodes in 1985. Fraser's absences between 1986 and 1988 were covered by Joan Bakewell, Victoria Glendinning, P. D. James, Libby Purves and Gay Search.

After Mason's death in 1971 Longland took over responsibility for compiling the questions, and was joined in that role by Peter Moore in 1972. After Longland's retirement Moore continued to set the questions until 1987. For the final season, in 1988, O'Donnell combined the roles of chairman and question-setter.

Content
The two teams faced questions devised, for the first 21 series, by Mason, of whom Muir wrote:

Mason and his successors provided word games and literary quizzes covering vocabulary, etymology, snippets of poetry, and the like. In many series the opening round consisted of obscure words for the panellists to define: examples ranged from such words as auscultation, bumblepuppy, cabless and crinkum-crankum to defenestration, hebetude, hobbledehoy and katydid to lallation, macaronic, palmiped and rahat lokum, or scrimshaw, tatterdemalion, unau and widdershins.

In the final round, each team was asked to give the origin of a famous phrase or quotation. In early shows, once the real answers were given, Muir and Norden were invited to explain the origin of the phrase less seriously, in the form of a feghoot. An early example was the quotation "Dead! And never called me mother!" from a stage adaptation of East Lynne, which became the exclamation of a youth coming out of a public telephone box which he had discovered to be out of order. Later the first part of the round was dropped in favour of having the chairman simply announce the accepted origin of each phrase, thus opening up new fields of phrases that would have been too well known or too obscure to be posed as questions. In later series Muir and Norden chose their own phrases in advance of each programme, and their stories became longer and more convoluted.

The stories became a popular segment of the quiz. Examples included Norden's tale in which a young woman and a young man found themselves happily trapped in a sauna despite earlier assurances from the landlord that the faulty lock had been repaired: "Least said, soonest mended" became "Lease said sauna's mended". In another, "There's many a slip 'twixt the cup and the lip" became a story about Édouard Manet in a drunken doze in a beauty spot between a carp pond and Lover's Leap – "There's Manet asleep 'twixt the carp and the leap". In another, Muir confessed to forging fan letters purportedly from Monica Dickens, Val Gielgud, Asa Briggs and Fay Compton, so that "I am monarch of all I survey" became "I am Monica, Val, Asa, Fay". A Norden story explaining "Charity shall cover the multitude of sins" became a lament for his diminishing capacity for alcohol and consequent need to enunciate extremely carefully after drinking spirits: "Clarity shall cover the multitude of gins".

Series history
A one-off pilot programme was broadcast by the Midland region of the BBC Home Service on 6 June 1956. When the series was launched on the national BBC network in January 1957, an edited edition of the pilot preceded the 14 new episodes.

Source: BBC Genome and Global British Comedy Collaborative.

Syndication and spin-offs
Over the years My Word! was syndicated through the BBC Transcription Services in more than 35 countries including not only Anglophone locations such as Australia and the US, but in countries including Chile, Germany and Russia. A televised version of the programme ran in Britain for a series of ten episodes on BBC Television from 10 July to 11 September 1960. The team and host were the same as for the radio series of that year; the producer was Barrie Edgar. A companion radio programme, My Music, ran from 1967 to 1993. When it was mooted, Muir and Norden told Shryane that they were too busy to take on another series, but they allowed themselves to be persuaded and became permanent features on the programme. In 1972 and 1973 the two shows joined forces to present Christmas specials, My Word! It's My Music, with Longland and Steve Race as co-hosts and the regular My Word team joined by Ian Wallace and  David Franklin (1972), and Wallace and John Amis (1973).

Between 1974 and 1989, Muir and Norden published five collections of their My Word! stories, and in 1991 an omnibus edition of the five volumes was issued:
 
 
 
 
 
 , a collection of all five volumes.

Notes, references and sources

Notes

References

Sources

External links
BBC Ends US Distribution
 297 episodes.

BBC Radio comedy programmes
British radio game shows
1950s British game shows
1960s British game shows
1970s British game shows
1980s British game shows
1956 radio programme debuts
1988 radio programme endings